The Rose of Versailles has been dramatized for Takarazuka Revue by Shinji Ueda. The show's role in Takarazuka history is particularly notable as it established the "Top Star" system that remains in place to this day.

The musicals have either played up the importance of the Oscar-Andre relationship, or the Fersen-Marie Antoinette relationship.  Shinji Ueda, a Takarazuka producer, asked Riyoko Ikeda to write new stories with scenes from the manga never before seen on stage and by placing a focus on minor characters.  In 2008 and 2009, four new musicals were staged based on the minor characters Girodelle, Alain de Soissons, and Bernard Chatelet, as well as André Grandier.

Takarazuka stage adaptations
 The Rose of Versailles - The plot of this original performance is said to be the closest to  Ikeda's manga

1974, Moon Troupe, top bill: Yuri Haruna, Asou Kaoru
 The Rose of Versailles: Andre and Oscar - The plot focus on the relationship between Oscar and Andre. The show went through several revisions over the course of the years. In later versions, Oscar is typically the lead role. However, in earlier versions, the show is often considered to have a double lead.

1975, Flower Troupe, top bill:Jun Anna, Yuri Haruna

1975, Snow Troupe, top bill: Natsuko Migiwa, Rei Asami

1976, Flower Troupe, National tour, top bill:

1979, Flower Troupe, National tour, top bill: Akira Matsu

1980, Snow Troupe, National tour, top bill: Natsuko Migiwa
 The Rose of Versailles III - The plot focus on the relationship between Hans Axel Von Fersen and Marie Antoinette. The Takarazuka run featured guest stars from other troupes performing in the role of Oscar. The show underwent a quick partial rewrite for the Moon Troupe performance, placing more emphasis on Fersen.
1976, Star Troupe (Takarazuka version), top bill: Ran Ōtori

1976, Moon Troupe (Tokyo version), top bill: Ran Ōtori
 Fantasy The Rose of Versailles - A shortened version of the Takarazuka version of Andre and Oscar

1977, Flower Troupe, National Tour, top bill: Jun Anna
 Takarazuka Fantasy The Rose of Versailles - A shortened and revised version of  Andre and Oscar

1978, Snow Troupe, National Tour, top bill: Natsuko Migiwa
 The Rose of Versailles: Andre and Oscar - The plot focuses on the relationship between Oscar and Andre. Andre is given the lead role.
1989, Snow Troupe, top bill: Keaki Mori, Ichiro Maki
 The Rose of Versailles: Fersen and Marie Antoinette - The plot focus on the relationship between Fersen and Marie Antoinette. Fersen is given the lead role.
1989, Star Troupe, top bill: Kaoru Hyuuga

2001, Cosmos Troupe, top bill: Yōka Wao

2006, Star Troupe, top bill: Wataru Kozuki
 The Rose of Versailles: Fersen  - A variation of Fersen and Marie Antoinette. Fersen is given the lead role.
1990, Flower Troupe, top bill: Mizuki Ōura

1991, Flower Troupe, Ueda, top bill: Mizuki Ōura
 The Rose of Versailles: Oscar, Andre
1991, Snow Troupe, National Tour, top bill: Keaki Mori
 The Rose of Versailles: Oscar - The plot focuses on Oscar, her love with Andre and her tragic end.
1991, Moon Troupe, top bill: Mayo Suzukaze
 The Rose of Versailles: Oscar and Andre - The plot focuses on the relationship between Oscar and Andre. Oscar is given the lead role.
2001, Star Troupe, top bill: Kō Minoru
 The Rose of Versailles - An abbreviated variation of Fersen and Marie Antoinette adapted specifically for the Takarazuka performances in Seoul, South Korea.
2005, Star Troupe, Korean Tour, top bill: Wataru Kozuki

2006, Snow Troupe, top bill: Hikaru Asami

2006, Snow Troupe, National Tour, top bill: Natsuki Mizu
 Gaiden - The Rose of Versailles: Girodelle - Focussing on Girodelle's love interest with Sophie, Fersen's younger sister.
2008, Snow Troupe, top bill: Natsuki Mizu
 Gaiden - The Rose of Versailles: Alain - Focussing on Alain, his unrequited love for Oscar and his relationship with his younger sister Dianne
2008, Flower Troupe, top bill: Sei Matobu
 Gaiden - The Rose of Versailles: Bernard - Focussing on Bernard and his love for Rosalie.
2008, Star Troupe, top bill: Kei Aran
 Gaiden - The Rose of Versailles: Andre - Focussing on Andre's childhood and a girl he knew before he fell in love with Oscar.
2009, Cosmos Troupe, top bill: Yūga Yamato

2009, Flower Troupe, top bill: Sei Matobu
 The Rose of Versailles: Oscar and Andre - The plot focuses on the relationship between Oscar and Andre. Oscar is given the lead role.
2013，Moon Troupe, top bill: Masaki Ryuu, Rio Asumi
 The Rose of Versailles: Fersen  - A variation of Fersen and Marie Antoinette. Fersen is given the lead role.
2013, Snow Troupe, top bill : Kazuho Sou
 The Rose of Versailles: Oscar and Andre - The plot focuses on the relationship between Oscar and Andre. Oscar is given the lead role.
2014, Cosmos Troupe, top bill: Kaname Ouki
 The Rose of Versailles: Fersen  - A variation of Fersen and Marie Antoinette. Fersen is given the lead role.
2014, Cosmos Troupe, National Tour, top bill: Manato Asaka

2014, Flower Troupe, top bill: Rio Asumi

2015, Flower Troupe, top bill : Rio Asumi

References

Further reading
 Rose Of Versailles Revival
 

The Rose of Versailles
Takarazuka Revue
Musicals based on anime and manga
Japanese musicals